San Miguel Arcangel Church may refer to any of various churches that are dedicated to Saint Michael the archangel:
San Miguel Arcángel Church (Cabo Rojo), Puerto Rico
San Miguel Arcangel Parish Church (Argao), Cebu, Philippines
San Miguel Arcangel Church (Marilao), Bulacan, Philippines
San Miguel Arcangel Church (Masantol), Pampanga, Philippines
San Miguel Arcangel Church (Orion), Bataan, Philippines
San Miguel Arcangel Church (San Miguel, Bulacan), Philippines